The Torture Never Stops is a live DVD by Frank Zappa, posthumously released in 2008.

It's made up of footage from one of Zappa's annual Halloween concerts at The Palladium in New York City, on October 31, 1981. Two shows were played that night, and this contains footage from both shows edited together.

Track listing 
 Black Napkins
 Montana
 Easy Meat
 Beauty Knows No Pain
 Charlie’s Enormous Mouth
 Fine Girl
 Teen-age Wind
 Harder Than Your Husband
 Bamboozled By Love
 We’re Turning Again
 Alien Orifice
 Flakes
 Broken Hearts Are for Assholes
 You Are What You Is
 Mudd Club
 The Meek Shall Inherit Nothing
 Dumb All Over
 Heavenly Bank Account
 Suicide Chump
 Jumbo Go Away
 Stevie’s Spanking
 The Torture Never Stops
 Strictly Genteel
 The Illinois Enema Bandit

Extras 
 Teen-age Prostitute
 City Of Tiny Lites
  You Are What You Is - music video
 Picture Gallery

Musicians
Frank Zappa: guitar, vocals
Ray White: guitar, vocals
Steve Vai: guitar, vocals
Scott Thunes: bass, vocals
Tommy Mars: keyboards, vocals
Bobby Martin: keyboards, saxophone, vocals (aka Robert Martin - Wikipedia page under this name)
Ed Mann: percussion, vocals
Chad Wackerman: drums

External links 
 Zappa.com

Frank Zappa
2008 video albums